Frode Hansen may refer to:

Frode Eike Hansen (born 1972) former professional Norwegian footballer at Lyn and Viking
Frode Holstad Hansen (born 1961) former Norway international footballer that played for Fredrikstad FK and Start